Caimito may refer to:

Caimito or Chrysophyllum cainito, a tropical fruit also known as star apple
Caimito, Sucre, a town in Colombia
Caimito, Cuba, a town in Artemisa Province (before 2011 in Havana Province)
Caimito, Panama
Caimito, San Juan, Puerto Rico, a barrio
Caimito, Juncos, Puerto Rico, a barrio
Caimito, Yauco, Puerto Rico, a barrio